Mari Eriksmoen is a Norwegian soprano and opera singer with a repertoire including roles for coloratura soprano and lyric soprano

Education and career 
Eriksmoen was educated at the Norwegian Academy of Music in Oslo, the Conservatoire National Supérieur de Musique et de Danse in Paris and the Royal Danish Opera Academy in Copenhagen. Eriksmoen debuted in 2006 and has performed through Europe.

She was described as "bright-voiced" and as showing "strength at both extremes of her range in a memorable 'Come scoglio' " in her performance as Fiordiligi in Così fan tutte, although reviews of earlier performances have been more mixed. Other performances have received strong reviews.

Awards 
In 2009 she received the Lindeman Prize for Young Musicians. In 2011 she received Statoil's talent stipend.

Personal life 
Eriksmoen lives in Bergen with her husband, conductor Eivind Gullberg Jensen and their two children.

References 

1983 births
People from Ski, Norway
Living people
Norwegian operatic sopranos